Wright-Carry House is a historic home located at Kenton, Kent County, Delaware.  The house was built about 1880, and is a two-story, three bay, center hall plan frame structure with a two-story rear wing.  Both sections have gable roof and the house exhibits Queen Anne style design elements.  Also on the property are a contributing summer kitchen, privy, and barn or carriage house.

It was listed on the National Register of Historic Places in 1983.

References

Houses on the National Register of Historic Places in Delaware
Queen Anne architecture in Delaware
Houses completed in 1880
Houses in Kent County, Delaware
Kenton, Delaware
National Register of Historic Places in Kent County, Delaware